Pierre Deslongchamps  (born 1938 in Saint-Lin-Laurentides, Quebec) is a Canadian chemist, and professor at Université de Sherbrooke.
He was a 1979 Guggenheim Fellow.

Life
He graduated from the Université de Montreal with a BSc in 1959 and from University of New Brunswick with a PhD in 1964.
He studied at Harvard University with Robert Burns Woodward.

He is Executive Scientific Advisor at OmegaChem.

References

External links
openparliament.ca

1938 births
People from Lanaudière
Canadian chemists
Université de Montréal alumni
University of New Brunswick alumni
Canadian Fellows of the Royal Society
Members of the French Academy of Sciences
Academic staff of the Université de Sherbrooke
Living people
Officers of the Order of Canada